Juan Bisquert (Düsseldorf, 1962),  is a Spanish physicist known for his contributions to materials and devices for sustainable energy production. He grew up in Dénia, and he is a professor at Jaume I University in Castellón de la Plana. His work on solar cells relates physical principles and modelling of electronic and ionic processes to the interpretation of measurement techniques for the photovoltaic operation.

Research activity 

At Universitat Jaume I he is the funding director of INAM (Institute of Advanced Materials), that develops research on materials, nanostructures and devices for the production of clean energy.

He has published more than 400 papers in scientific journals. He has been cited more than 40,000 times in scientific journals. From  2014 to 2022 he appeared in the list "ISI Highly Cited Researchers"

He wrote a series of books that have been published in the single volume "The Physics of Solar Energy Conversion". He edited the monography Photoelectrochemical Solar Fuel Production: From Basic Principles to Advanced Devices".

He is a Senior Editor of the "Journal of Physical Chemistry Letters". He created nanoGe conferences..

His doctoral thesis was in the field of mathematical physics, on problems of algebraic quantization. His research work takes place in a multidisciplinary area that covers hybrid and organic nanotechnology solar cells as well as other functional devices of advanced materials, including perovskite solar cells and the production of semiconductor fuel from sunlight. Bisquert has developed the application of measurement techniques and physical modelling that relate the operation of the photovoltaic devices to the elementary electronic stages that take place at the nanoscale. For example, one of the main contributions of Professor Bisquert has been to define and demonstrate the relevance of the concept of Chemical Capacitance in nanostructured semiconductor devices, especially solar cells and photovoltaic devices. His latest work is about making articificial neurons and synapses for brain-like computational systems.

References 

1962 births
Spanish physicists
Living people